The Ministry of Digital Governance is a government department of Greece. It was initially formed on 27 June 2011 as the Ministry of Administrative Reform and Electronic Governance. On 27 January 2015, it was merged with the Ministry of the Interior and the Ministry of Public Order and Citizen Protection to form the Ministry of the Interior and Administrative Reorganization. It was revived as two distinct ministries on 5 November 2016: the Ministry of Administrative Reorganization and the Ministry of Digital Policy, Telecommunications and Media. The former was reabsorbed by the Ministry of the Interior on 9 July 2019, while the latter was renamed the Ministry of Digital Governance. The incumbent minister in the Cabinet of Kyriakos Mitsotakis is Kyriakos Pierrakakis, who also serves as one of three Ministers of State.

History
The ministry was formed on 27 June 2011 by Presidential Decree 65/2011, following a proposal by Prime Minister George Papandreou. It resulted from the division of the Ministry of the Interior, Decentralization and Electronic Governance and, in particular, the establishment of the General Secretariat of Public Administration and Electronic Governance as a separate ministry. The latter was established at the recommendation of the Ministry of the Interior, Public Administration and Decentralization in 1995 with the merger of the then ministries of the Presidency of the Government and of the Interior, and comprised services from the former department. The Ministry was based in Vasilissis Sofias Avenue 15, Athens.

The responsibilities of the Ministry extended to all matters concerning Public Administration, both at the organizational level, such as the simplification of administrative procedures, the relations between citizens and the state, the organization of public services and administrative reform, and in terms of human resources, such as legislation on civil servants and private-law employees of the public sector. It was also responsible for the fundamental electronic governance and development of information technology and new technologies in public administration (e.g. "open government"). The Ministry also included the Corps of Inspectors-Controllers of Public Administration and the General Inspector of Public Administration, the National Printing Office and independent authorities of the Ombudsman and the Supreme Council for Civil Personnel Selection (ASEP). Finally it supervised the National Centre for Public Administration and Local Government (EKDDA) and the "Information Society" limited company.

According to the Prime Ministerial decision Y4/21.6.2012, it ranked fifth in the hierarchy of the cabinet ministries.

Among the competencies of the current ministry is government oversight of the Hellenic Space Agency.

Ministers for Administrative Reform and Electronic Governance (2011–2015)

Ministers for Administrative Reorganization (2016–2019)

Minister for Digital Policy, Telecommunications and Media (2016–2019)

Minister for Digital Governance (since July 2019)

See also
Cabinet of George Papandreou
Cabinet of Lucas Papademos
Caretaker Cabinet of Panagiotis Pikrammenos
Cabinet of Antonis Samaras
Second Cabinet of Alexis Tsipras
Cabinet of Kyriakos Mitsotakis

External links
Official website

References

Digital Governance
Digital Governance
2011 establishments in Greece
Digital Governance
Greece